New Georgia, with an area of , is the largest of the islands in Western Province, Solomon Islands, and the 200th-largest island in the world.

Geography

New Georgia island is located in the New Georgia Group, an archipelago including most of the other larger islands in the province. New Georgia forms part of the southern boundary of the New Georgia Sound. Kolombangara lies across the Kula Gulf to the west, Choiseul to the northeast, Vangunu is to the southeast, and Rendova to the southwest, across the Blanche Channel.

New Georgia is a volcanic island, surrounded in some places by a coral reef.

The climate is wet and tropical, and the island is subject to frequent cyclones. New Georgia is covered with dense vegetation, in the marshy areas mangroves are located.

Population
The population of the island was 19,312  in 1999.  Most of the population resides on the south coast; however, the main settlement is the village of Munda, located in the west. On the southeastern coast is the village of Sege. The islanders speak several Melanesian languages. The ten languages spoken on the island are from the family of New Georgia languages, a subgroup of the Northwest Solomonic languages within the Oceanic languages, a major group of the Austronesian family.

The Kalikoqu is a tribe in the Roviana Lagoon on the southern side of New Georgia Island; the larger tribal polities are the chief districts of Saikile and Kalikoqu.

History
The central part of New Georgia is the cradle of Roviana culture. A large complex of megalithic shrines and other structures was developed in the 13th century AD. Later, between the 15th and 17th centuries Roviana people moved over to smaller barrier islands at New Georgia with a hub in Nusa Roviana.

Through trade and headhunting expeditions, Nusa Roviana turned into the regional centre of power and trade. In the late 19th century the rule of the last chief of head hunters, Ingova, was ended by a British punitive expedition. On March 15, 1893, New Georgia was declared part of the British Solomon Islands Protectorate.

The Methodist Mission in New Georgia was established by Rev. John Frances Goldie in 1902.  He dominated the mission and gained the loyalty of Solomon Islander members of his church. The relationship with the colonial administrators of the British Solomon Island Protectorate were also fraught with difficulty, at this time due to Goldie’s effective control over the Western Solomon Islands.

From 1927 to 1934 Dr Edward Sayers worked at the Methodist mission where he established a hospital at Munda and carried out fieldwork in the treatment of malaria.

Since July 1978, the island has been part of the independent state of Solomon Islands.

World War II 

The island was occupied by the Empire of Japan in the early stages of World War II.  During Pacific War, the United States' New Georgia Campaign opened with landings on New Georgia and nearby islands on 30 June 1943. New Georgia was secured by American forces on 23 August, after weeks of difficult and bloody jungle fighting, although fighting continued on some nearby islands until October 1943.

Munda, the Japanese base on New Georgia Island, was the main objective of the assault on the island. This base was not overrun until 5 August 1943.

Donald Gilbert Kennedy was a Coastwatcher stationed at Seghe (Segi) on New Georgia during the Solomon Islands campaign during the Pacific War.

See also
Seghe, Solomon Islands

References

External links
Toto isu/NguzuNguzu: War Canoe Prow Figureheads from the Western District, Solomon Islands
 

Islands of the Solomon Islands
Solomon Islands (archipelago)
Western Province (Solomon Islands)
Headhunting